SMS Sachsen  was the lead ship of her class of four ironclads of the German Kaiserliche Marine. Sachsen was built in the AG Vulcan shipyard in Stettin. She was laid down in April 1875, launched on 21 July 1877, and commissioned on 21 October 1878. The ship was armed with a main battery of six  guns in individual open mounts.

Sachsen was built when the German navy was primarily concerned with coastal defense against either French or Russian fleets. The ship participated in routine fleet maneuvers for the duration of her active career. On her last such fleet exercise, in 1901, she accidentally rammed and sank the aviso . The following year, Sachsen was placed in reserve, and in 1911, she was used as a target hulk for the fleet. The ship was eventually broken up for scrap in 1919, following the German defeat in World War I.

Design 

The Sachsen class was the first group of capital ships built under the tenure of General Albrecht von Stosch, the first Chief of the Imperial Admiralty. Stosch favored a coastal defense strategy for the German fleet, and the Sachsens were intended to operate from fortified ports, from which they could sortie to attack blockading fleets. They proved to be controversial in service, as critics pointed out their poor seakeeping, tendency to roll in heavy seas, and low speed compared to earlier armored frigates.

Sachsen was powered by two 3-cylinder single-expansion steam engines, which were supplied with steam by eight coal-fired Dürr boilers. The boilers were vented into four funnels in an unusual square arrangement. Her standard complement consisted of 32 officers and 285 enlisted men, though while serving as a squadron flagship this was augmented by another 7 officers and 34 men.

She was armed with a main battery of six  guns, two of which were single-mounted in an open barbette forward of the conning tower and the remaining four mounted amidships, also on single mounts in an open barbette. As built, the ship was also equipped with six  L/24 guns and eight  Hotchkiss revolver cannons for defense against torpedo boats. 

Sachsen's armor was made of wrought iron, and was concentrated in an armored citadel amidships. The barbette armor was 254 mm of wrought iron backed by 250 mm of teak.

Service history 
Sachsen was ordered by the Imperial Navy under the contract name "B," which denoted that the vessel was a new addition to the fleet. She was built at the AG Vulcan shipyard in Stettin; her keel was laid down in 1875 under yard number 74. The ship was launched on 21 July 1877, and was commissioned into the German fleet on 20 October 1878. She was the first large, armored warship built for the German navy that relied entirely on engines for propulsion. After her commissioning, Sachsen joined the German fleet, which was tasked primarily with coastal defense against France and Russia, who were presumed to be the most likely enemies in a continental war. In the early 1880s, heightened tensions with Russia prompted the naval command developed more offensively-minded contingencies. These formed the basis for the annual summer fleet maneuvers, in which Sachsen took part. In 1887, she was present for the ceremonies marking the beginning of construction of the Kaiser Wilhelm Canal, which was to link the Kiel with the North Sea.

Kapitän zur See Otto von Diederichs took command of the ship in 1889. Sachsen took part in a goodwill visit to Portsmouth to take part in the Cowes Regatta. Following the trip to England, Sachsen and the rest of the fleet conducted the annual summer exercises. At 15:45 on 27 February 1890, Sachsen ran aground outside Kiel in foggy weather. The grounding dented the bottom of the hull and tore it open. However, on 2 March, the ship was able to get underway at high tide. Repairs lasted for two weeks. In 1891, the German navy stopped the practice of deactivating the fleet in the winter months and instead kept the front-line units on permanent active duty. The fleet was also reorganized, to form two four-ship divisions. Sachsen and her sisters were assigned to I Division, under the command of Admiral Hans von Koester. Annual fleet training cruises were conducted in April. The summer fleet maneuvers, which occurred during mid-August to mid-September, up through 1894 were always centered on defensive actions in the North and Baltic seas.

Starting in 1896, Sachsen was dry-docked at the Imperial Dockyard in Kiel for an extensive modernization. The ship's entire propulsion system, including screws, boilers, and engines were replaced with new equipment. The single-expansion engines were replaced with compound engines that offered higher performance. The four funnels were trunked into a single stack and a new conning tower was built, protected by nickel-steel. The secondary battery was also improved: the 8.7 cm guns were replaced with 8.8 cm SK L/30 quick-firing guns and the eight 3.7 cm machine guns were replaced with four newer models. On 1 May 1897, the ship was re-commissioned for trials, during which the ship reached .

On 4 September 1901, Sachsen collided with the aviso  while on extensive training maneuvers with the rest of the fleet. Wacht was sunk, but the crew was safely evacuated and neither ship suffered casualties. During the maneuvers, Wacht attempted to pass between Sachsen and her sistership Württemberg. However, Wachts helmsman misjudged the distance and passed too closely in front of Sachsen. Sachsen immediately attempted to reverse course to avoid ramming the cruiser, but the ships collided. Sachsens ram bow tore a large hole in Wacht, which began to slowly sink. The battleship  attempted to tow Wacht to shallow water, but several of Wachts internal bulkheads collapsed under the strain and the ship quickly sank.

In 1902, Sachsen was withdrawn from active service and placed in the reserve fleet. The ship remained as a reserve vessel until 19 February 1910, when she was stricken from the navy list. The following year, Sachsen was used as a target hulk off the coast of Schwansen for the fleet. Following the German defeat in World War I in 1918, the vessel was sold to Hattinger Co., which broke the ship up for scrap in Wilhelmshaven in 1919.

Footnotes

Notes

Citations

References 

 

 

 

Sachsen-class ironclads
1877 ships
Ships built in Stettin
Maritime incidents in 1901